Following is a list of senators of Charente-Maritime, people who have represented the department of Charente-Inférieure or Charente-Maritime in the Senate of France.
Charente-Inférieure was one of the 83 original departments created during the French Revolution on 4 March 1790. It was renamed Charente-Maritime on 4 September 1941.

Third Republic

Senators for Charente-Inférieure under the French Third Republic were:

 Jean-Baptiste Boffinton (1876–1885)
 Auguste Roy de Loulay (1876–1885)
 Alfred de Vast-Vimeux (1876–1885)
 Pierre Barbedette (1885–1901)
 Frédéric Mestreau (1885–1891)
 Émile Combes (1885–1921)
 Jean Moinet (1891–1894)
 Eugène Bisseuil (1892–1903)
 Auguste Calvet (1894–1912)
 Paul Rouvier (1901–1912)
 Frédéric Garnier (1903–1905)
 Georges Genet (1906–1919)
 Eugène Réveillaud (1912–1921)
 Gustave Perreau (1912–1939))
 Pierre Landrodie (1920–1922)
 Jean Coyrard (1921–1937)
 Fernand Chapsal (1921–1939)
 Jean-Octave Lauraine (1923–1934)
 René Carré-Bonvalet (1934–1945)
 Maurice Palmade (1938–1945)
 William Bertrand (1939–1945)

Fourth Republic

Senators for Charente-Maritime under the French Fourth Republic were:

 Yves Le Dluz (1946–1948)
 Jean Réveillaud (1948–1955)
 James Sclafer (1948–1955)
 André Dulin (1948–1959)
 Maurice Sauvêtre le 19 juin 1955)
 Jacques Verneuil (1955–1959)

Fifth Republic 

Senators for Charente-Maritime under the French Fifth Republic have been:

References

Sources

 
Charente-Maritime